The Piano Concerto in A minor by Ottorino Respighi is a concerto for piano and orchestra written in 1902 and published in 1941. The work takes around 20 minutes to perform.

Structure 
The concerto is in three movements:

Scoring 
The concerto is scored for piano, pairs of flutes, oboes, clarinets in B, bassoons, horns in F, trumpets in B, and timpani and strings.

External links 
 

Concertos by Ottorino Respighi
Respighi
1902 compositions